"Whistle for the Choir" is a song by Scottish rock band the Fratellis. It was released on 27 November 2006 as the band's third single and reached number nine on the UK Singles Chart, marking their second UK top-10 single. In the band's native Scotland, the song reached number two, becoming their second song to reach that position after "Chelsea Dagger".

The working title for the song was "Knickers in a Handbag", named after a line from Scottish comedian Billy Connolly. The artwork points toward the old name by showing a girl on the cover handling a pair of knickers above a handbag.

Music video
The video shows the band singing on darkened streets. It was filmed in Glasgow city centre, including Buchanan Street and Sauchiehall Street.

Track listings

This is listed in the iTunes Store as the Whistle for the Choir - EP even though it contains two other singles from the Fratellis' debut album, Costello Music.

Charts

Weekly charts

Year-end charts

Certifications

In popular culture
 "Whistle for the Choir" is featured on the soundtrack of a 2007 episode of the American drama series Brothers & Sisters and in the 2009 Community episode "The Politics of Human Sexuality".
 The song was featured on the controversial Channel 4 drama Britz.
 James Gunn used the song in his film The Suicide Squad (2021). Barry Fratelli was very pleased with this, saying he was a huge fan of Gunn's films.

References

External links
 "The Fratellis Official Website" Official site

The Fratellis songs
2006 singles
2006 songs
Song recordings produced by Tony Hoffer
Songs written by Jon Fratelli